Cullin-9 is a protein that in humans is encoded by the CUL9 gene.

Interactions
PARC (gene) has been shown to interact with P53.

References

Further reading